Jarota Jarocin is a football club in Jarocin, Poland, competing in III liga, group II, the fourth flight of domestic football.

Players

Current squad

Out on loan

References

External links
 Official club website
 Jarota Jarocin (90minut.pl)

Association football clubs established in 1998
1998 establishments in Poland
Football clubs in Greater Poland Voivodeship
Jarocin County